"I Kissed a Girl" is a song by American singer-songwriter Jill Sobule. The song, released on May 2, 1995, reached number 20 on the US Billboard Modern Rock Tracks chart, number 67 on the Billboard Hot 100, and number 36 on the Australian ARIA Singles Chart. In Canada, it debuted and peaked at number 15 on the newly established RPM Alternative 30 chart.

Music video
The music video featured Italian model Fabio playing Sobule's heterosexual love interest. It parodies his romance novel covers, and features young women in 1960s-style hair and dresses.

Track listings and formats
 CD single
 "I Kissed a Girl"  – 3:13
 "Resistance Song"  – 2:59
 "I Kissed a Girl" (live) – 3:02

 Cassette single
 "I Kissed a Girl"  – 3:13
 "Resistance Song"  – 2:59

Charts

Katy Perry song comparisons
In 2008, pop singer Katy Perry issued a song of her own called "I Kissed a Girl" for her debut album One of the Boys. The song received mixed reviews, with some reviewers negatively comparing Perry's song to Sobule's. Hiponline.com wrote that the song is "not nearly as interesting or exciting as you’d expect. It’s not even half as good as Jill Sobule’s song 'I Kissed a Girl'". Glitterati Gossip wrote that Sobule's song "was ten times better, because there was actual emotional content to her lyrics". Sobule shared her feelings about Perry's song and use of the title in a July 2009 interview with The Rumpus:

In a later interview, Sobule later stated that the interview in The Rumpus was tongue-in-cheek and in an article she wrote for The Huffington Post, she stated

References

Songs about kissing
1995 singles
1995 songs
Atlantic Records singles
Bisexuality-related songs
Lesbian-related songs